Newtown Battlefield State Park, formerly known as Newtown Battlefield Reservation, was the site of the Battle of Newtown fought in August 1779, during the American Revolutionary War.  It was the only major battle of the Sullivan Expedition, an armed offensive led by General John Sullivan that was ordered by the Continental Congress to end the threat of the Iroquois who had sided with the British in the American Revolutionary War.  In the battle, the Iroquois were defeated decisively. A portion of the battlefield is today managed as a  state park.  The entire battlefield (about ) was declared a National Historic Landmark in 1965.

Description and history
The Newtown Battlefield is located along the eastern bank of the Chemung River, in western New York southeast of Elmira.  Its main focus is Sullivan Hill, a  wooded hill that was fortified by the Iroquois in a bid to ambush Sullivan's column.  The main trail followed by Sullivan's troops had to pass near the steep hillside, which was only  from the river.  Sullivan's advance forces discovered the Iroquois works, and Sullivan set up his artillery on a rise to the south, from which it could command not just Sullivan Hill but also another hill to the east.  After cannonading the Iroquois position, Sullivan sent troops up Baldwin Creek, which skirts the hill to the east.  These forces eventually formed a battle line that drove the Iroquois from the position.

The state acquired  of land, covering most of Sullivan Hill, which it managed first as a state reservation, and then as a state park.  A narrow column of white granite known as the Newton Battlefield Monument was erected on top of Sullivan Hill in 1912.

On January 19, 2010, New York State Governor David Paterson proposed closing the park to reduce the state's growing budget deficit. However, the park was allowed to remain open after budget adjustments were made throughout the state's park system.

See also
List of New York state parks
List of National Historic Landmarks in New York

References

External links
New York State Parks: Newtown Battlefield State Park

New York (state) in the American Revolution
National Historic Landmarks in New York (state)
American Revolutionary War sites
State parks of New York (state)
Parks in Chemung County, New York
National Register of Historic Places in Chemung County, New York
American Revolution on the National Register of Historic Places